'''Hilary Robinson is a British children's author, broadcaster,  radio producer and feature writer.

Background
The daughter of lecturers, Robinson grew up in Zaria, Nigeria during the Nigerian Civil War, and later in Dorset and Yorkshire. Her father, P. H. Turner, was an economist and a biographer of David Livingstone who established an educational trust and spearheaded the building of a non-profit independent school in Zaria, Nigeria. Robinson attended this school with other local and overseas children, including theatre director Rufus Norris. Her mother was a lecturer in mathematics and statistics with the Open University.

Career

Radio producer
Robinson worked at Radio Aire, TV-am and Yorkshire Television and the BBC's Faith and Ethics Department.  She is now an independent radio producer.

Book awards

Where The Poppies Now Grow
 The Carnegie and Kate Greenaway Medals 2015 – Nominations
 The Hampshire School's Library Award 2014 - shortlisted
 The Education Resources Award 2015 - finalist
 English Association Book Award 2015 – shortlist
 Rubery Book Award 2015 – shortlisted
 Coventry Libraries Book Award 2016 – shortlisted

The Christmas Truce
 The Education Resources Award 2015 – finalist
 Sheffield Children's Book Award 2015 – finalist
 The People's Book Prize 2016 – finalist

Flo Of The Somme
 WINNER – Historical Association – Young Quillss Award 2016
 WINNER - North Somerset Teacher's Book Award Poetry section 2016
 WINNER - EOCT/SLS Picture Book Award 2017

A Song For Will and The Lost Gardeners of Heligan
 WINNER - North Somerset Teacher's Book Award Quality Fiction 2017
 SHORTLIST - Historical Association's Young Quills Award 2018 
 WINNER - Holyer an Gof 2018 - Books for children of Primary Age
 WINNER - Holyer an Gof 2018, The Gorsedh Kernow Ann Trevenen Jenkin Cup - Awarded for authorship in the class for children and young adults

Gregory Goose is on the Loose - Up The Mountain

 SHORTLIST - Sheffield Children's Book Award - 2021

Personal
Robinson lives and works in London and Yorkshire. She is a Fellow of the Royal Society of Arts and a member of the Society of Authors.

Books
 1995 Sarah the Spider
 1995 Sarah the Spider Prima Spiderina
 Learning English With Ozmo
 1999 E-mail: Jesus@Bethlehem
 1999 Sarah the Spider and the Barn Dancers
 1999 Sarah the Spider's Christmas Surprise
 2000 Mr. Spotty's Potty
 2000 Spells and Smells
 2002 Freddie's Fears
 2002 Pick it Up (The Green Gang)
 2002 The Green Gang - Raffy's Party
 2002 Scrapman Stan And The Magical Mixer Fixer
 2003 E-mail: Jesus@Anytime
 2003 Flynn Flies High
 2003 Pippin's Big Jump
 2004 Batty Betty's Spells
 2004 How to Teach a Dragon Manners
 2004 Mixed Up Fairy Tales
 2005 Cinder Wellie
 2005 Croc by the Rock (also Big Book edition)
 2005 Pet to School Day
 2005 Rapunzel
 2005 The Frog Prince
 2005 The Princess's Secret Letters
 2006 Aladdin and the Lamp
 2006 Over the Moon!
 2006 The Little Match Girl
 2006 The Royal Jumble Sale
 2007 Pocahontas the Peacemaker
 2007 The Princess's Secret Sleepover
 2008 Goldilocks and the Wolf
 2008 Snow White and the Enormous Turnip (also Big Book edition)
 2008 The Elves and the Emperor
 2009 Ted's Party Bus
 2009 Three Pigs and a Gingerbread Man
 2010 The Big Book of Magical Mix-Ups
 2012 Hooray! It's Book Day - Franklin Watts
 2012 The Copper Tree - 
 2012 The Copper Tree Class Christmas Surprise
 2013 The Copper Tree Class Help A Hamster
 2013 Mixed Up Nursery Rhymes
 2013 Beauty, The Beast and The Pea
 2013 Hansel and Gretel and the Ugly Duckling
 2013 Rapunzel and the Billy Goats Gruff
 2013 Cinderella and the Beanstalk
 2014 Where The Poppies Now Grow
 2014 The Christmas Truce
 2014 Rapunzel (Must Know Stories), Franklin Watts
 2015 Aladdin (Must Know Stories), Franklin Watts
 2015 Tom's Sunflower
 2015 Flo Of The Somme
 2016 Sid's Red Card, Franklin Watts
 2016 The Frog Prince (Must Know Series), Franklin Watts
 2016 Favourite Mixed Up Fairy Tales
 2016 A Song For Will – Strauss House Productions
 2017 Christmas Fairy Tales Mix-Up - Hodder
 2018 Peace Lilly – Strauss House Productions
 2018 Spooky Fairy Tale Mix Up - Hodder
 2019 Jasper Space Dog - Strauss House Productions
 2019 Gregory Goose Is On The Loose in Space (November) - New Frontier
 2019 Gregory Goose Is On The Loose in the  Jungle (December) - New Frontier
 2020 Jasper Viking Dog (February) - Strauss House Productions 
 2020 Gregory Goose Is On The Loose Up the Mountain (March) - New Frontier
 2020 Gregory Goose Is On The Loose at the Fair (March) - New Frontier
 2021 The Christmas Star - SPCK
 2021 Ten Little Yoga Frogs  - New Frontier
 2021 Twelve Little Festive Frogs - New Frontier
 2021 Old Tabby Brontë, The Servant's Tale - Strauss House Productions
 2022 God's Love In A Nut Shell - SPCK
 2022 Tatty Mouse, Rockstar - New Frontier

References

External links
Official website

1962 births
English children's writers
Living people
People from Paignton
Writers from Yorkshire